Hamid Reza Sadr (19 April 1956 – 16 July 2021) was an Iranian football and film critic, journalist, author, university professor, historian, and economist. Sadr earned a Ph.D. in urban planning after studying at both the University of Tehran and Leeds University in England. He was well known for his publications on various subjects such as football, cinema, and non-fiction based on history and social studies.

Career
Hamid Reza Sadr movie reviews were published in many Iranian journals since 1981 including Zan-e Rooz, Soroush, Film Magazine, Film International, and Haft or Seven magazine. He has explained his critical approach to films as "relative, not unconditional"; he analysed a film for what he felt was its likely audience, yet he usually approached movies emotionally, with a strongly touching writing style. He was especially cruel to some films that had been roasted by many critics, such as Bahram Beizai and Masoud Kimiai films. The originality of his opinions, as well as the vigorous way in which he expressed them, won him eager supporters as well as angry critics.

He translated 'From Reverence to Rape: The Treatment of Women in the Movies", the influential book by Molly Haskell which published in Zan-e Rooz magazine.

He wrote a book on politics and Iranian cinema, called Iranian Cinema: A Political History. The comprehensive analysis provided in this book gives refreshing, up-to-date introduction to those interested in Iranian cinema and its socio-political dimensions and history, observing recurrent themes and genres as well as highlighting lesser-known thematic concerns and figures. Sadr, while acknowledging the lack of imaginative expression in mainstream Iranian cinema: the weak scripts, the poor performances, the repetitive and conservative nature and content, argued for and analysed the political contexts and the constant shifts embedded within the apparently least noteworthy of Iranian films.

Sadr was known for his monthly column called "Shadow of Imagination" {سایه خیال} appearing in Film  Magazine and his reports on international film festivals particularly on London Film Festival. He interviewed many famous actors, directors and film critics including: Anthony Hopkins, Peter O'Toole, Mike Leigh, Jim Jarmusch, Carlos Saura, Andrei Konchalovsky, Peter Wollen, Laura Mulvey, Jeffrey Noel Smith, John Gillett, Sohrab Shahid-Sales and Farokh Ghafari.

He was a co-producer of Looking for Scheherazade movie, a documentary directed by Safi Yazdanian in 2003.

He was a football lover and has written several features on sociology, politics and football. His book Once Upon a Time Football is about politics and football but it also tells the story of Sadr's relationship with football and sometimes relates it to his own personal life. It has been years now that he appeared on the Iranian national television to talk about football matches and thus has become famous among people.

Death
Sadr was diagnosed with stage IV colon cancer in September 2018. He began writing his last book from the day he found out about his sickness, a book about his battle with it and all that went through his head during the following months. After three years of battle, he died of cancer on 16 July 2021 at the age of 65 years.

Books
Comedy Cinema (Tehran, 1987, Film Publication)
 Conversation note to Dora, 1994 
 یه چیزی بگو by Laurie Halse Anderson, 1999 (Translator) 
 Iranian Cinema: A Political History (Tehran, 2001, Ney Publications) 
 The Memorial Secretary: A Novel 
Against the Wind: Politics of Iranian Cinema (Tehran, 2002, Zarrin Publications)
Iranian Cinema: A Political History (London, 2006, I.B. Tauris)
Once Upon a Time Football (Tehran, 2000, Avige Publication) which is a personal review of football based on political and social events.
A contributor in Life and Art : The New Iranian Cinema (BFI, 1999,London)
A contributor in The New Iranian Cinema: Politics, Representation & Identity (London, 2002, I.B. Tauris)
The Damned Utd (Tehran, 2010, Cheshmeh Publications) which is a translation of David Peace's novel.
Once Upon a Time Football (Tehran, 2011, Cheshmeh Publications) which is the updated version of the previous book.
 The curse of the greengrocer Mohamed Bouazizi. Democracy or Islamic Rule? Vienna Lectures in the City Hall, Vol. 158, 2011 
The Hot Seat (Tehran, 2012, Cheshmeh Publications)
A Boy On the Terraces (Tehran, 2013, Cheshmeh Publications)
You Will Die in Cairo (Tehran, 2014, Cheshmeh Publications), non fiction and the winner of Jalal Al-E-Ahmad literature prize.
Speak (Tehran, 2017, Cheshmeh Publications), Translation of Laurie Halse Anderson's novel.
Three Hundred Twenty Five (Tehran, 2017, Cheshmeh Publications), non-fiction novel.
The Eternal Jerseys( Tehran, 2018, Cheshmeh Publications), A poetic look at the legendary football players.
From Gheytarieh to Orange County (Tehran, 2021, Cheshmeh Publications), non-fiction about his life from the day he found out he had cancer until his death. The ending of the book is written by his daughter, Ghazaleh Sadr.

References

External links
 Hamid Reza Sadr's list of publications

1956 births
2021 deaths
Iranian writers
Iranian film critics
Sports journalists
People from Tehran
University of Tehran alumni
Alumni of the University of Leeds